Regina Maria Roche (1764–1845) is considered a minor Gothic novelist, encouraged by the pioneering Ann Radcliffe. However, she was a bestselling author in her own time. The popularity of her third novel, The Children of the Abbey, rivalled that of Ann Radcliffe's The Mysteries of Udolpho.

Life
Born Regina Maria Dalton in Waterford, Ireland in 1764. Her father, Blundel Dalton, was a captain in the British 40th Regiment. Her family moved to Dublin. After marrying Ambrose Roche in 1794, she moved to England.

Her first two novels were published under her maiden name, before the success of The Children of the Abbey and Clermont. Both were translated into French and Spanish and went through several editions. However, after her fifth novel, The Nocturnal Visit, appeared in 1800, Roche suffered financial difficulties, having fallen afoul of a duplicitous solicitor. She did not write again until 1807, when she received aid from the Royal Literary Fund. She then wrote 11 more novels, most of them set in rural Ireland. None of these matched her earlier successes. After her husband's death in 1829, she returned to Waterford.

After bouts of depression, Roche died in relative obscurity in her native town at the age of 81. The Gentleman's Magazine obituary calls her a "distinguished writer [who] had retired from the world and the world had forgotten her. But many young hearts, now old must remember the effect upon them of her graceful and touching compositions."

Popularity
The Children of the Abbey, a sentimental Gothic Romance, was one of the most popular novels of the 1790s. Her Clermont was Roche's only full attempt at writing a truly Gothic novel. It has a decidedly darker in tone than anything else she wrote.

Both novels went through several editions and were translated into French and Spanish. Clermont was one of the Northanger Horrid Novels satirised by Jane Austen in her novel Northanger Abbey.

Bibliography
The Vicar of Lansdowne: or, Country Quarters, 1789
The Maid of the Hamlet. A Tale, 1793
The Children of the Abbey: a Tale, 1796
Clermont: a Tale, 1798
Nocturnal Visit: a Tale, 1800
Alvandown Vicarage, 1807
The Discarded Son: or, Haunt of the Banditti; a Tale, 1807
The Houses of Osma and Almeria: or, Convent of St. Ildefonso; a Tale, 1810
The Monastery of St. Columb: or, The Atonement; a Novel, 1814
Trecothick Bower: or, The Lady of the West Country; a Tale, 1814
The Munster Cottage Boy: a Tale, 1820
Bridal of Dunamore and Lost and Won. Two Tales, 1823
The Tradition of the Castle: or, Scenes in the Emerald Isle, 1824
The Castle Chapel: a Romantic Tale, 1825
Contrast, 1828
The Nun's Picture, 1834

References

External links

 
Book description of Clermont (Valancourt Books)

1764 births
1845 deaths
Irish expatriates in England
18th-century English novelists
19th-century English novelists
18th-century Irish novelists
19th-century Irish novelists
18th-century British women writers
19th-century English women writers
People from County Waterford
Writers from London
Irish horror writers
English horror writers
Irish women novelists
Women horror writers
English women novelists
Writers of Gothic fiction
18th-century English women
18th-century English people